Yevgen Rogachov (born 30 August 1983), is a Ukrainian futsal player who plays for Energy Lviv and the Ukraine national futsal team.

References

External links
UEFA profile

1983 births
Living people
Ukrainian men's futsal players
SK Energia Lviv players
MFC Lokomotyv Kharkiv players